The Football League play-offs for the 2000–01 season were held in May 2001, with the finals taking place at Millennium Stadium in Cardiff. The play-off semi-finals will be played over two legs and will be contested by the teams who finish in 3rd, 4th, 5th and 6th place in the Football League First Division and Football League Second Division and the 4th, 5th, 6th and 7th placed teams in the Football League Third Division table. The winners of the semi-finals will go through to the finals, with the winner of the matches gaining promotion for the following season.

Background
The Football League play-offs have been held every year since 1987. They take place for each division following the conclusion of the regular season and are contested by the four clubs finishing below the automatic promotion places.

In the First Division, Bolton Wanderers, who are aiming to return to the top flight after nearly 3 seasons outside the top flight, finished 4 points behind second placed Blackburn Rovers, who in turn finished 10 points behind champions Fulham, who returned to the top flight for the first time since 1968. Preston North End who are aiming to return to the top flight for the first time since 1961, finished in fourth place in the table. Birmingham City, who are aiming to return to the top flight after 15 years outside the top division, finished in fifth place. West Bromwich Albion, who are also aiming to return to the top flight for the first time since 1986, finished 4 points behind Birmingham City and Preston North End in sixth place.

First Division

Semi-finals
First leg

Second leg

Bolton Wanderers won 5–2 on aggregate.

Preston North End 2–2 Birmingham City on aggregate. Preston North End won 4–2 on penalties.

Final

Second Division

Semi-finals
First leg

Second leg

Reading won 2–1 on aggregate.

Walsall won 4–2 on aggregate.

Final

Third Division

Semi-finals
First leg

Second leg

Blackpool won 5–1 on aggregate.

Leyton Orient won 2–1 on aggregate.

Final

External links
Football League website

 
English Football League play-offs
play-offs
May 2001 sports events in the United Kingdom